Vincent Leo Warren (born February 18, 1963) is a former American football wide receiver who played one season with the New York Giants of the National Football League (NFL). He was drafted by the New York Giants in the fifth round of the 1986 NFL Draft. He played college football at San Diego State University and attended Eldorado High School in Albuquerque, New Mexico. He was a member of the New York Giants team that won Super Bowl XXI.

References

External links
Just Sports Stats
Fanbase profile

Living people
1963 births
Players of American football from Arkansas
American football wide receivers
San Diego State Aztecs football players
New York Giants players
Sportspeople from Little Rock, Arkansas